New Taipei Kings (Chinese: 新北國王) is a professional basketball team based in New Taipei, Taiwan. They have been part of the P. League+ since the 2021–22 season.

Facilities

Home arenas

Training facilities
The Kings' training facility is located at the HTC headquarters sports court.

Roster

Head coaches

Season-by-season record

References

External Link
 https://www.newtaipeikings.com/

2021 establishments in Taiwan
Basketball teams established in 2021
P. League+ teams